Lyso- is a prefix applied to the various phospholipids to indicate the removal of one of the two fatty acids. For example, lysophosphatidylcholines are phosphatidylcholines with a single acyl group in either the 1- or 2-position.

Chemistry prefixes